This is a list of populated places that are on the Connecticut River.

Upper Connecticut River 
Bold communities have over 10,000 population.

New Hampshire 

 Pittsburg
 Clarksville
 Stewartstown
 West Stewartstown
 Colebrook
 Columbia 
 Tinkerville
 Stratford
 North Stratford
 Northumberland
 Lancaster
 Dalton
 Littleton
 Monroe
 Bath
 Haverhill
 Woodsville
 North Haverhill
 Piermont 
 Orford 
 Lyme
 Hanover
 Lebanon 
 West Lebanon
 Plainfield 
 Cornish 
 Balloch
 Claremont
 Charlestown 
 Walpole
 North Walpole
 Westmoreland
 Chesterfield
 Hinsdale

Vermont 

 Canaan 
 Beecher Falls
 Lemington
 Bloomfield
 Brunswick
 Maidstone
 Guildhall
 Lunenburg 
 Concord
 Waterford
 Barnet
 McIndoe Falls
 Ryegate
 Newbury
 Wells River
Bradford
Fairlee 
Thetford
Norwich
Lewiston
Hartford
Wilder
White River Junction
Hartland
North Hartland
Windsor
Weathersfield
Ascutney
Springfield
Rockingham
Bellows Falls
Westminster
 North Westminster
Putney
Dummerston 
Brattleboro
Vernon

Middle Connecticut River 
Bold cities have over 15,000 population. Italics are for towns or cities in the Springfield Metro area. Underlines are for communities in the Hartford Metro area.

Massachusetts 

 Northfield 
 Gill
 Erving
 Montague
 Turners Falls
 Greenfield
 Deerfield 
 Sunderland
 Whately 
 Hatfield
 Hadley
 North Hadley
 Northampton
 Easthampton 
 Mount Tom
 South Hadley
 Holyoke
 Chicopee
 West Springfield
 Springfield
 Agawam
 Longmeadow

Connecticut 
 Suffield
 Enfield
 Thompsonville
 Windsor Locks
 East Windsor
 Windsor
 South Windsor

Lower Connecticut River (Connecticut only) 
Bold communities have over 25,000 population. This section of the river is completely in the Hartford Metro area.

 Hartford
 East Hartford
 Hockanum
 Wethersfield
 Glastonbury
 South Glastonbury
 Rocky Hill
 Cromwell
 Portland
 Middletown
 East Hampton
 Middle Haddam
 Haddam
 Higganum
 East Haddam
 Chester
 Lyme
 Deep River
 Essex
 Old Lyme
 Old Saybrook

See also 
 List of crossings of the Connecticut River

References

Populated places on the Connecticut River
Populated places in Connecticut
Populated places in Massachusetts
Populated places in New Hampshire
Populated places in Vermont